Bhaktivedanta Hospital & Research Institute, instituted in 1998, is a hospital in District Thane, India. It is located at Mira Road in District Thane, near Mumbai and caters to patients in the western suburbs from Borivali to Virar and beyond.

Bhaktivedanta Hospital is a project of Shri Chaitanya Welfare Charitable Trust. It is established as a tribute to Swami Prabhupada, the founder of ISKCON.

Origin 
A group of undergraduate students, they held medical camps in the slums and villages around Mumbai, Maharashtra, India. In 1986, after completing their specializations in various medical fields, the group gradually evolved into a nursing home and finally the Bhaktivedanta Hospital.

The Bhaktivedanta Hospital was opened on 11 January 1998. The hospital also conducts the annual free Barsana Eye Camp

Annual Free Cataracts Surgery Camp 
Bhaktivedanta Hospital runs an annual free cataract surgery camp, the Barsana Eye Camp, in Barsana, Mathura District. The camp aims to serve the people residing in Barsana and the surrounding 120 villages.

References

External links 
Bhaktivedanta Hospital - Serving in Devotion

Hospital buildings completed in 1998
International Society for Krishna Consciousness charities
Hospitals in Mumbai
Mira-Bhayandar
1998 establishments in Maharashtra
Hospitals established in 1998
20th-century architecture in India